The University of Kinshasa, commonly known as UNIKIN, is one of the three major universities in the Democratic Republic of the Congo, together with the University of Kisangani and University of Lubumbashi. Originally founded in 1954 as Lovanium University during Belgian colonial rule, the current university was established following the division of the National University of Zaire (UNAZA) in 1981. It is located in Kinshasa.

The university had an enrollment of 29,554 and a faculty and research staff of 1,929 in the 2018–19 academic year, and currently has twelve academic divisions.

Campus

Many of the campus facilities have deteriorated and are in poor condition, or lack proper instructional tools - in 2003, the science library had as few as 300 titles in its collection. Since 2001, the university has hosted Cisco Academy, a joint project sponsored by the American software company Cisco and the United Nations Development Programme. The academy focuses on providing recent technology, training students to install and operate computer networks and all coursework is online. The university does not feature in any university rankings.

History

Lovanium University
The university was established in 1954 as Lovanium University by Belgian colonial authorities following criticism that they had done too little to educate the Congolese people. The university was originally affiliated with the Catholic University of Leuven in Belgium. When it opened, the university received heavy subsidies from the colonial government and funding from the Ford Foundation, the Rockefeller Foundation and the United States Agency for International Development and was lauded as the best university in Africa.

National University of Zaire

In August 1971, the university was merged with the Protestant Autonomous University of Congo (Université Libre du Congo) and The University of Congo at Lubumbashi (founded in 1956) into the National University of Zaire (Université Nationale du Zaïre, UNAZA). Ties were cut with the Catholic University of Leuven, and funding for the university began to drop precipitously. At this point, the university had an enrollment capacity of just 5,000.

The decision to merge the private universities into one centralized system was made, at least partially, to counter concerns about political demonstrations on campuses. The entire higher education system was run by a single rector and faculty and staff were put on the federal payroll.

By 1981, the centralized system became too burdensome and the decision was made to re-establish the three separate institutions: the University of Kinshasa, Kisangani University, and the University of Lubumbashi.

Decline in funding

Newly independent, the University of Kinshasa continued to struggle financially throughout the 1980s. By 1985, the campus was in decline, strewn with trash and the dormitories in poor condition. The university's cafeteria stopped serving meals and pay for professors slipped as low as $15.

In response to declining government funds tuition was raised 500 percent in 1985, and in 1989, deeper cuts were made, with the suspension of nearly all scholarships and financial aid and institution of new fees. Through the 1980s, as much as 90 percent of the university's budget was paid for by the government, with only a small amount of revenues coming from student tuition. By 2002, the government only contributed $8,000 (USD) of the university's estimated $4.3 million annual budget (not including some personnel costs which are paid directly by the state).

Nuclear reactor 

The first nuclear reactor in Africa was built at the University of Kinshasa in 1958. The reactor, known as TRICO I, is a TRIGA reactor built by General Atomics. TRICO stands for a combination of TRIGA or “Training Isotopes General Atomic” and Congo. The reactor was built while the country was still under Belgian control, and with the assistance of the United States government, under the Atoms For Peace program. TRIGA I was estimated to have a 50-kilowatt capacity and was shut down in 1970. In 1967, the African Union established a nuclear research center, the Regional Center for Nuclear Studies and the United States agreed to provide another TRIGA reactor. The second reactor, TRICO II, is believed to have a one-megawatt capacity and was brought online in 1972.

In 2001, the TRICO II reactor was reported to be operational, but was apparently put on standby in 1998. The government of the Democratic Republic of Congo stopped funding the program in the late 1980s, and the United States has since refused to ship replacement parts.

International observers have long been concerned about the safety and security of the two nuclear reactors and the enriched uranium they contain.

Faculties and divisions 

There are twelve academic divisions at the university:

 Faculty of Arts and Humanities
 Faculty of Law
 Faculty of Economics and Management
 Faculty of Social Sciences Policy and Administrative
 Faculty of Engineering
 Faculty of Science
 The following subjects are available to study in the Faculty of Science: Physics, mathematics, computer science, biology, chemistry, geology.
 Faculty of Agricultural Sciences
 Faculty of Psychology and Educational Sciences
 Faculty of Medicine
The following subjects are available to study in the faculty of medicine: biological medicine, physical medicine and dentistry.
 Faculty of Pharmaceutical Sciences
 Faculty of Veterinary Medicine
 Faculty of Petrochemistry and Renewable Energies

Public figures

Former teachers

 Marcel Lihau, lawyer
 Mabi Mulumba, Congolese politician

Notable alumni

 Didier Etumba, Congolese military officer
 Sylvestre Ilunga, Congolese politician
 Steve Wembi, Congolese criminologist and investigative journalist
 Webe Kadima, Congolese academic
 Emmanuel Ramazani Shadary, Congolese politician
 Alain Daniel Shekomba, Congolese businessman, politician and physicist
 Jacqueline Penge Sanganyoi, Congolese politician

References

Further reading

External links 

 Homepage of the University of Kinshasa 

University of Kinshasa
Kinshasa
Education in Kinshasa
Schools in Kinshasa
1954 establishments in the Belgian Congo
Educational institutions established in 1954